Gastrolobium rigidum (common name rigid-leaf poison) is a small bushy shrub in the pea family (Fabaceae), native to Western Australia.

It was first described as Oxylobium rigidum by Charles Gardner in 1964. It was transferred to the genus, Gastrolobium in 1987 by  Michael Crisp and Peter Weston.

Etymology 
The specific epithet, rigidum, is a Latin adjective derived from the verb, rigidere ("to be stiff") and describes the plant as being "stiff", or  "inflexible".

References

External links 

 Gastrolobium rigidum occurrence data from Australasian Virtual Herbarium

Plants described in 1964
Taxa named by Charles Gardner
rigidum